Edward Leland Taylor (April 10, 1885 – February 16, 1948) was mayor of Louisville, Kentucky from 1945 to 1948.

Life
E. Leland Taylor was born in Knoxville, Tennessee and moved to Louisville with his family when he was 13. He graduated from Louisville Male High School and the University of Virginia, where he received a law degree in 1912. He practiced law in Louisville but eventually worked in real estate. During his term, he was able to secure land for the expansion of the city and its highway system.

He is buried at Cave Hill Cemetery.

References

1885 births
1948 deaths
Mayors of Louisville, Kentucky
Burials at Cave Hill Cemetery
20th-century American politicians